is a Japanese four-panel manga series written and illustrated by Tarabagani. It has been serialized since August 2014 in Media Factory's Comic Cune magazine and as of September 2016, it has been collected into a single tankōbon volume. An anime television series adaptation by EMT Squared aired from January 8 to March 26, 2017.

Characters

The main protagonist of the series. She is shy by nature and has 3 cats (Maa, Shii and Rou).

One of Yuko's cats. She is a mischievous Munchkin who loves to explore. 

One of Yuko's cats. She is a laid back Singapura cat.

One of Yuko's cats. She is a level headed Russian Blue.

Yuko's friend/classmate and a popular girl in their class. She is from a rich family and has a cat named Elza.

A gyaru-ish girl and Azumi's self-proclaimed rival, who often challenges her, and has a fear of cats.

Azumi's Turkish Angora cat.

Media

Manga
Nyanko Days is a four-panel manga series by Tarabagani, a Japanese manga artist who mainly draws adult comics. It began serialization in Comic Cune October 2014 issue released on August 27, 2014; At first, Comic Cune was a "magazine in magazine" placed in Monthly Comic Alive, later it became independent of Comic Alive and changed to a formal magazine on August 27, 2015. Nyanko Days is also available on Kadokawa Corporation's ComicWalker website. It has been collected in a single tankōbon volume.

Anime
An anime television series adaptation aired between January and March 2017. Yoshimasa Hiraike directed the series at EMT Squared. Miwa Oshima designed the characters. Crunchyroll streamed the anime. Each episode is approximately two minutes in length.

Episode list

Note

References

External links
  
 Nyanko Days at ComicWalker 
 Anime official website
 

2017 anime television series debuts
Anime series based on manga
Crunchyroll anime
EMT Squared
Kadokawa Dwango franchises
Manga adapted into television series
Media Factory manga
Seinen manga
Yonkoma